Hydrophyllum tenuipes, the Pacific waterleaf, is an herbaceous perennial plant native to North America. It is found in western North America from British Columbia to northern California.

Ecology
The Hydrophyllum tenuipes plant spreads by rhizomes to form large colonies in wooded areas. Flowers are greenish-white to lavender, appearing in mid to late spring.

Description
Five conspicuous stamen extend beyond the five petals to a length more than twice as long as the petals. Sepals bristly on margins. There are numerous clusters of flowers on stalks extending from upper leaf axils.

Range
Hydrophyllum tenuipes grows at low to mid elevation in shady conditions often in close association with Tolmiea menziesii (Youth on Age), which blooms during the same period.

References

External links

Jepson Manual Treatment
Photo gallery

tenuipes
Flora of California
Flora of Oregon
Flora of Washington (state)
Flora of British Columbia
Flora without expected TNC conservation status